Jared D. Warley was an A.M.E. minister, farmer, judge, and state legislator in South Carolina. He represented Clarendon County, South Carolina in the South Carolina House of Representatives from 1870 to 1874 and in the South Carolina Senate from 1874 to 1877 when he resigned after Democrats took control.

He was one of the incorporators of the Clarendon Land Joint Stock and Loan Association.

He was sworn in on November 22, 1870. Elias E. Dickson contested  Warley's election in 1874. John Laurence Manning was elected to succeed him.

There was a Jared D. Waverly Jr. who lived in Saint Paul, South Carolina.

References

Year of birth missing
Republican Party South Carolina state senators
African-American state legislators in South Carolina
19th-century American clergy
African-American politicians during the Reconstruction Era
African-American judges
South Carolina state court judges
19th-century American judges
Republican Party members of the South Carolina House of Representatives
Year of death missing
Farmers from South Carolina
People from Clarendon County, South Carolina
African-American farmers